Hypericum lanuginosum, or downy St. John's wort, is a perennial herb, a flowering plant in the St. John's wort family Hypericaceae.

Description
The species grows from 10 to 80 centimeters tall. It has a woody rootstock with few stems. Its leaves have dense whitish veins and are subglabrous on both surfaces. The stems are green and terete and have 2-4 lined internodes. The dimensions of the leaves are 15–60 mm by 5–25 mm. Its flowers are 15–20 mm in diameter and are rounded.

Distribution and habitat
Hypericum lanuginosum is found in Sinai, Southern Turkey, Western Syria, Lebanon, Israel, Jordan, and Cyprus. Its habitat is in moist, shady areas, usually by rocks, 0–2400 meters from sea level.

References

lanuginosum
Flora of Cyprus
Flora of Egypt
Flora of Israel
Flora of Jordan
Flora of Lebanon
Flora of Palestine (region)
Flora of Turkey
Taxa named by Jean-Baptiste Lamarck